Paraxena is a genus of moths in the subfamily Lymantriinae. The genus was erected by George Thomas Bethune-Baker in 1911. Both species are found in Angola.

Species
Paraxena esquamata Bethune-Baker, 1911
Paraxena angola Bethune-Baker, 1911

References

Lymantriinae